In the run up to the 1993 Polish parliamentary election, Centre for Public Opinion Research (CBOS) and OBOP carried out opinion polling to gauge voting intention in Poland. Results of such polls are displayed in this article.

The date range for these opinion polls are from the previous parliamentary election, held on 27 October 1991, to 19 September 1993.

Opinion polls

References

1993
1993 in Poland